Taylor Lawrence Abrahamse (born May 7, 1991) is a Canadian voice actor, most known for his music, Fangbone!, The Stanley Dynamic, Doc, D.N. Ace, and Norman Picklestripes.

Life and career 
After begging his parents for an agent at the age of six, he began landing numerous commercials in TV & radio, as well as print. Soon, this transitioned over into supporting TV movie & series roles, including Jimmy Osmond in the ABC biopic Inside the Osmonds, & Eliott in PAX TV's Doc, a series starring Billy Ray Cyrus for which Taylor was nominated for a Young Actor's Award for 'Best Performance In A Supporting Role'. Taylor also played Cinco, in the Ross Petty pantomime Snow White & The Group Of Seven, acting and singing alongside Canadian Idols including Ryan Malcolm & Billy Klippert, and Glass Tiger frontman Alan Frew.

At the age of 12, after receiving an Elton John songbook, Taylor became obsessed with singing & songwriting. As a teenager, Taylor was a Top 40 finalist on Canadian Idol. In the years that followed, he continued to write music as a solo artist and for others. He has produced, written & performed various songs for popular YouTube channel Super Planet Dolan - videos centered around those songs have amassed over 20 million views. Taylor also has had various independent 'demo' releases, and for a time, an 'Abra-vault' on his website that housed thousands of other demos, dictations, reflections, videos, lyrics & more. After a spontaneous performance at a music conference, Taylor was discovered by Jimi Hendrix producer Eddie Kramer, who insisted on working with Taylor. That album, produced by Kramer with additional production by Taylor, was released in 2020. The lead single "I Won't Put Up With It", features a music video largely edited & directed by Taylor. 

Taylor also wrote the music & lyrics for The Beaver Den: A New Canadian Musical, is the co-owner/operator of Silverthorn Studios, a professional recording facility in Toronto, co-creator/manager of The Song Creation Workshop, and contributor to the workshop's best-selling book The Song Creation Formula.

Taylor's voice can be heard around the world in a variety of television properties, such as the lead character in the self-titled series Fangbone! (Disney XD), which after a multi-award-winning pilot episode, began airing worldwide in 2016, and also features a theme song written by Taylor and performed by Peter Driemanis of Juno-winning group July Talk. Taylor can also be heard as Luke Stanley in YTV's The Stanley Dynamic (Nelvana/Amaze), which lasted for two seasons, a series that required Taylor on-set four to five days a week to bring the animated character to life through his body as well as his voice. 

Other notable voice roles include Luis in The Future Is Wild (Discovery Kids), Yuki in Beyblade: Metal Fury (Cartoon Network), and Jonas in Bob! The Slob (Teletoon), in addition to many supporting roles in series such as The Cat In The Hat, Total Dramarama and Looped!. Since 2019, he and Bryn McAuley voice the gophers in Norman Picklestripes (Universal Kids) alongside Dwayne Hill as the main character. In 2020, Taylor was nominated for an ACTRA Award for his performance as leading character Huxley Plunderman in 'D.N.Ace''.

In 2022, Taylor lost his professional recording studio, Silverthorn Studios, despite finding investors willing to save the space - a devastating turn of events personally & financially. In the weeks before its demolition, Taylor frantically recorded a series of live albums & other recordings which are now slowly being released. Their release raise funds & awareness for Hugh's Room Live in affording their forever home. If successful, Hugh's Room has also agreed to acquire what could be salvaged from the old Silverthorn location and build it back better with Taylor & Bryn's guidance.

Filmography

Television

References

External links 
 
 

1991 births
Living people
Canadian male voice actors